Northern Westmoreland Career and Technology Center is a part-time vocational–technical school in the northern section of Westmoreland County in the U.S. state of Pennsylvania. It is the smallest of three vocational–technical schools in the county.

Sending school districts 
There are four sending school districts, which each have their own high school.

Programs 
There are several programs at the school for the students.
 Auto Body Collision Repair and Refinishing
Auto Mechanics
Carpentry
Commercial Art
Computer Technology
Cosmetology
Culinary Arts
Electronics
Heating, Ventilation, and Air Conditioning (HVAC)
Machine Tool
Marketing
Masonry
Medical
Welding

References

External links
 

Schools in Westmoreland County, Pennsylvania
Public high schools in Pennsylvania